George Richmond may refer to:
George Richmond (painter) (1809–1896), English painter
George H. Richmond (1944–2004), American educator
George N. Richmond (1821–1896), Wisconsin legislator
 George Richmond (cinematographer), British cinematographer